João de Loureiro (1717, Lisbon – 18 October 1791) was a Portuguese Jesuit missionary and botanist.

Biography 

After receiving admission to the Jesuit Order, João de Loureiro served as a missionary in Goa, capital of Portuguese India (3 years) and Macau (4 years). In 1742 he traveled to Đàng Trong (known to the Europeans as Cochinchina), remaining there for 35 years. Here he worked as a mathematician and naturalist for the king of Đàng Trong, acquiring knowledge on the properties and uses of native medicinal plants. In 1777, he journeyed to Canton, in Bengal, returning to Lisbon four years later. During this period, the Captain Thomas Riddel gave Loureiro the books Systema Naturae, Genera Plantarum and Philosophia Botanica by Carl Linnaeus, which greatly influenced the Portuguese botanist.

The first 40 years he stayed in Vietnam, João de Loureiro was inventorying indigenous herbal remedies. His local garden contained 1,000 unique herbal species, making him one of the greatest botanist collectors of the 18th century.

João de Loureiro 1790, he published the book Flora Cochinchinensis sponsored by the Royal Portuguese Academy of Sciences. João de Loureiro has numerous species "loureiroi" dedicated to him, mostly plants but also the dinosaur Draconyx loureiroi in honour of his being the first Portuguese palaeontologist.

The taxonomist Elmer Drew Merrill later argued that Loureiro's work contained various mistakes caused by a misunderstanding of the Linnaean system.

Standard author abbreviation

Works 

Flora Cochinchinensis: sistens plantas in regno Cochinchina nascentes: quibus accedunt aliae observatae in Sinensi imperio, Africa orientali, Indiaeque locis variis: omnes dispositae secundum systema sexuale Linnaeanum
 Flora Cochinchinensis […] denuo in Germania edita, notes by Carl Ludwig Willdenow, 1793
 « On the nature and mode of production of Agallochum or aloes-wood », translated from Portuguese into English, in Tracts relative to botany, tr. from different languages, London, Phillips and Fardon […], 1805

Bibliography 
 Pe. João de Loureiro : missionário e botânico by José Maria Braga, 1938.

References 

18th-century Portuguese botanists
Catholic clergy scientists
1717 births
1791 deaths
Botanists active in Asia
Botanists active in China
Botanists active in India
Jesuit scientists
Portuguese Roman Catholic missionaries
Scientists from Lisbon
Jesuit missionaries in China
Jesuit missionaries in India
Jesuit missionaries in Vietnam
Portuguese expatriates in Vietnam
18th-century Portuguese Jesuits
18th-century Portuguese physicians
Missionary botanists